Lere Paimo ,  (born 19 November 1939) is a Nigerian film actor, film maker, producer and director.

Early life
Chief Lere Paimo, MFR was born on November 19, 1939 in Ile Ikoyi Odan, Osupa, Ogbomosho, a city in Oyo State southwestern Nigeria. His father was a tobacco and yam farmer, the leader of the local farmers’ organization. His mother was a trader. Chief Lere Paimo was sent to primary school in Ogbomoso, but then left for the Gold Coast where he continued his education in the Gold Coast ( current day Ghana) up to teacher training college where he obtained Teacher’s Grade two certificate. He eventually returned back to Nigeria and decided to stay in Osogbo where he worked as a class-room teacher in a Baptist Missionary School,

Career
He began acting in 1960 after he joined the Oyin Adejobi theatre group, a theatre group founded by Pa Oyinade Adejobi before he later joined Duro Ladipo's Theatre Group where he featured in a stage play titled Obamoro with the role of "Chief B asa".
He became popular following a lead role as  played in an epic yoruba film t Thtled Ogbori Elemosho which brought him into limelight.
He had featured, produced and directed several Nigerian films since he began acting in 1963.
In 2005, in recognition of his im In around 1960, while working as a teacher in Osogbo, he decided to join Oyin Adejobi theatre group, a theatre group founded by Pa Oyinade Adejobi which was an organization performing plays for churches, schools, and cultural and social clubs. A year later in about 1961, Duro Ladipo invited him to Mbari Club, the cultural centre founded by Ulli Beier to take part in an art production. He was interested in painting as well as in theatre, so he accepted the invitation. Fr

F

From the beginning, Lere Paimo’s talent as an actor was recognized and he was given leading roles. In Eda, a Yoruba version of Ev he played Everyman himself, so memorably that up till today his nickname has remained Eda Onile ola. While with Duro Ladipo, he featured in a stage play titled Obamoro with the role of "Chief Basa". eryman,mense contributions to the Nigerian film industry, he was bestowed a National award of Member of the Federal Republic alongside Zeb Ejiro by Olusegun Obasanjo the former President of the Federal Republic of Nigeria.
In May 2013, it was reported that he had a partial stroke, an attack he survived.
In April 2014, he won N1m cash prize in a Nigerian game show, Who Wants to be a MIllionaire.

Awards
Order of the Federal Republic (2005)

References

Living people
1939 births
Nigerian male film actors
Yoruba male actors
20th-century Nigerian male actors
21st-century Nigerian male actors
Male actors in Yoruba cinema
Male actors from Oyo State
People from Ogbomosho
Nigerian male television actors
Members of the Order of the Federal Republic
People from Oyo State
Nigerian film directors
Nigerian film producers
20th-century births